Robert Foley (born 1953) is an American politician from the U.S. State of Maine. Foley is a Republican State Senator from the 34th Senate District, representing the towns of Acton, Kennebunk, Lebanon, North Berwick, Wells, and part of Berwick. He replaced Ronald Collins, who could not run for another term due to term limits

Before being elected to the Maine Legislature, Foley served as a Selectman for Wells. Foley currently resides there with his wife, Maryanne, and two children. He is still currently a employed in the insurance sector as a Certified Insurance Counselor.

Foley served in the Maine House of Representatives representing District 7 from 2014 until 2018. While in the House, he served on the Insurance and Financial Affairs Committee.

In the Senate, Foley serves on the Environment and Natural Resources Committee and the Health Coverage, Insurance and Financial Services Committee.

References

1953 births
Living people
People from Wells, Maine
Maine city council members
University of Southern Maine alumni
Republican Party members of the Maine House of Representatives
Republican Party Maine state senators